Alistair Elliot (13 October 1932 – 3 November 2018) was a British librarian, poet and translator.

Life
He was born in Liverpool, son of a Scottish family doctor and an English mother, and educated at Asheville School, Asheville, North Carolina, Fettes College, Edinburgh, and Christ Church, Oxford.

He was a vegetable invoice clerk in Covent Garden market, night sterilizer in a food factory, waiter, film critic, supply teacher, actor (with the English Children's Theatre under Caryl Jenner) and finally librarian in Kensington, Keele, Shiraz, and lastly at Newcastle University.

His translation of Euripides's Medea was performed in theatres in London and New York in a production by Jonathan Kent with Diana Rigg in the leading rôle.

His poems appeared in Oxford Poetry, The Paris Review, and many  other journals.

Awards
 2000 Cholmondeley Award

Works

Poetry
Air in the Wrong Place, Eagle Press, 1968.
 Contentions, Ceolftith 38, 1977, signed edition ISBN 0 90446 1 24 6.  ordinary edition ISBN 0 90446 1 21 1
 Kisses: Poems collaboration with Barry Hirst, Ceolfrith, 1978. ISBN 978-0-904461-42-8
Talking Back, 1982.
On the Appian Way, 1984.

Translation

Editor

References

1932 births
2018 deaths
Alumni of Christ Church, Oxford
English librarians
English male poets
English people of Scottish descent
People educated at Fettes College